Saeid Karimi (born 1 February 2000) is an Iranian football striker who played for Iranian football club Mes Rafsanjan in the Persian Gulf Pro League.

Club career

Persepolis
Karimi joined Persepolis in summer 2018 with a contract until 2022. He made his professional debut for Persepolis on February 1, 2019 in 1–0 win against Sepidrood as a substitute for Siamak Nemati and scored his first goal for the club.

Career statistics

Honours
Persepolis
Persian Gulf Pro League (1): 2018–19
Hazfi Cup (1) : 2018-19
Iranian Super Cup (2): 2018, 2019

References

2000 births
Living people
Iranian footballers
People from Dogonbadan
Naft va Gaz Gachsaran F.C. players
Persepolis F.C. players
Persian Gulf Pro League players
Association football forwards
Shahin Bushehr F.C. players
Mes Rafsanjan players